A Legacy is a semi-autobiographical novel by Sybille Bedford first published in 1956. It depicts a fictionalized version of the marriage of her parents and the troublesome relations of their two families. Their familial tumults and tragedies are set in the newly unified Germany.  The book explores Prussian militarism in the years approaching the First World War. Many writers, including Victoria Glendinning and Roger Kimball, cite it as evidence of Bedford's underrated brilliance.

See also
 Jigsaw (novel)

References

1956 British novels
Novels set in Germany
Weidenfeld & Nicolson books
British novels adapted into television shows